Daria Moshynska (born 31 October 2007 in Kharkiv, Ukraine) is a Ukrainian synchronised swimmer. She is a two-time World champion and two-time European champion.

References

External links
 Moshynska's profile at the FINA website

2007 births
Living people
Ukrainian synchronized swimmers
World Aquatics Championships medalists in synchronised swimming
European Aquatics Championships medalists in synchronised swimming
21st-century Ukrainian women